The 1974 Maryland gubernatorial election was held on November 5, 1974. Incumbent Democrat Marvin Mandel defeated Republican nominee Louise Gore with 63.50% of the vote.

Primary elections
Primary elections were held on September 10, 1974.

Democratic primary

Candidates
Marvin Mandel, incumbent Governor
Wilson K. Barnes, former Judge of the Maryland Court of Appeals
Morgan L. Amaimo
Howard L. Gates

Results

Republican primary

Candidates
Louise Gore, former State Senator
Lawrence Hogan, U.S. Representative

Results

General election

Candidates
Marvin Mandel, Democratic
Louise Gore, Republican

Results

References

1974
Maryland
Gubernatorial